The Welsh Mountain Zoo is a zoological garden located near the town of Colwyn Bay in Conwy County Borough, Wales. The zoo was opened on 18 May 1963 by the wildlife enthusiast and naturalist Robert Jackson.

Development

After the Zoological Society of Wales was formed in 1983 to manage the interests and operation of the zoo, its development programme led to the creation of the following features:
 Jungle Adventureland (completed 1986)
 European Otter Enclosure (1987)
 Chimpanzee World and Chimp Encounter (1990)
 Children's Farm (1990)
 Bear Falls (1996)
 Golden Eagles (1999)
 Sea Lion Rock (2006)
 Condor Haven (2007)
 Lemur Walkthrough (2012)
 Red Pandas & Otters (Prytherch Himalayan Terraces) (2013)
 Gibbon Heights (2014)
 Wallaby Enclosure (Under Development)

Recent additions
2006 - The arrival of a pair of endangered snow leopards and the breeding of the very first Bactrian camel in Wales followed. Caracaras have now been placed in the old condor aviary. Margay are another recent addition to the collection.

The zoo's next development project is the construction of a new tropical house for reptiles and new alligator facilities. Work began in 2007 with the demolition of the old tortoise and cactus house.

Species list

Mammals

African crested porcupine
Oriental small-clawed otter
Bactrian camel
California sea lion
Chimpanzee
Cottontop tamarin
European brown bear
Fallow deer
Emperor tamarin
Margay
Lar gibbon
Przewalski wild horse
Red-faced black spider monkey
Red-necked wallaby
Red panda
Red squirrel
Snow leopard
Sumatran tiger
Welsh mountain goat

Birds

African Aviary — including starlings, pigeons and village weavers
Andean condor
Blue-and-yellow macaw
Caracara
Chilean flamingo
Common rhea
Common shelduck
Domestic ducks
Fantail pigeon
Great grey owl
Green-winged macaw
Scarlet macaw
Grey plantain-eater
Humboldt penguin
Ostrich
Raven
Various waterfowl species

Reptiles

Boa constrictor
Burmese python
Eastern box turtle
Kingsnake
Leopard gecko
Leopard tortoise
Mississippi alligator
Red-eared terrapin
Red-footed tortoise
Royal python
Snapping turtle
Spiny-tailed lizard

Amphibians

African bullfrog
Phantasmal Poison Frog

Invertebrates

Giant land snail
Tarantula

Children's Farm animals

Domestic chicken
Ducks
Guinea pig
Domestic rabbit
Turkey

References

External links

Tourist attractions in Conwy County Borough
Zoos in Wales
Colwyn Bay